
Gmina Osieczna is a rural gmina (administrative district) in Starogard County, Pomeranian Voivodeship, in northern Poland.

Villages
Gmina Osieczna contains the villages and settlements of Bałkany, Cisiny, Długie, Duże Krówno, Jastrzębie, Jeże, Klaniny, Leśny Dwór, Małe Krówno, Nowy Dwór, Osieczna, Osówek, Owcze Błota, Parcele, Pólka, Starzyska, Szlachta, Wiązak, Zdrójno and Zimne Zdroje.

Neighbouring gminas
Gmina Osieczna is bordered by the town of Czarna Woda and by the gminas of Czersk, Kaliska, Lubichowo, Osiek and Śliwice.

References
Polish official population figures 2006

Osieczna
Gmina Osieczna